Väino Puura (born 30 January 1951 in Keema, Võru County) is an Estonian opera and operetta singer (baritone).

In 1978, he graduated from Tallinn State Conservatory.

From 1976 to 2011, he was soloist for Estonian National Opera.

Besides opera roles, he has also participated in several music films (e.g. "Siin me oleme"), television series (e.g. "Kelgukoerad")

Roles

 envoy (Cherubini's "Medeia", 1971 in Vanemuine)
 friend (Oit's "Kes usub muinasjutte", 1972 in Vanemuine)
 Figaro and Almaviva (Mozart "Figaro pulm", 1976 in Tallinna State Conservatory, 1996 in Theatre Estonia)

References

1951 births
Living people
20th-century Estonian male opera singers
Estonian male musical theatre actors
Estonian male stage actors
Estonian male film actors
Estonian male television actors
20th-century Estonian male actors
Estonian Academy of Music and Theatre alumni
People from Võru Parish